Greatest Hits Vol. III is an album by the Everly Brothers that was released on the Barnaby Records label in 1977.

Track listing 
 "Brand New Heartache"
 "Should We Tell Him"
 "Love Of My Life"
 "Since You Broke My Heart"
 "Barbara Allen"
 "Hey Doll Baby"
 "Long Time Gone" F. Hartford, T. Ritter	
 "Lightning Express"
 "Keep A Knockin'"
 "Leave My Woman Alone"

The Everly Brothers compilation albums
1977 greatest hits albums